Lonza may refer to:
Lonza, a swift spotted beast in Dante's Inferno, 1.
 Lonza Group, a Swiss company
 Lonza Bowdler (1901-1962),  Welsh rugby union player
 Lonza (river), a river which runs through the Lötschental valley in Valais, Switzerland
 Lonza stagionata, cured pork tenderloin